Home and Away is an Australian television soap opera. It was first broadcast on the Seven Network on 17 January 1988. The following is a list of characters that appeared in 2014, by order of first appearance. All characters were introduced by the serial's executive producer Lucy Addario. The 27th season of Home and Away began airing from 27 January 2014. The following month saw the characters Sean Green and Denny Miller introduced. Linda Somerset began appearing from April. Sophie Taylor arrived in June, while Martin Ashford made his debut in October. Jolene Anderson was introduced as Neive Devlin in November.

Sean Green

Sean Green, played by Khan Chittenden, made his first screen appearance on 6 February 2014. The character and Chittenden's casting was announced during the 1–7 February 2014 issue of TV Week. Sean is a part of established character Andy Barrett's (Tai Hara) "dark" past. Sean turns up in Summer Bay and trashes the gym, shortly after Andy begins working there. Andy is then blamed for the damage and shortly afterwards, he runs into Sean. Hara commented "Andy's shocked because Sean's the last person he'd expected to see in Summer Bay. Andy thought he was in jail." Sean wants Andy to go to the police and change his story about a deal they were both involved in. Sean then threatens Andy's younger brother, Josh (Jackson Gallagher) and his girlfriend Maddy Osborne (Kassandra Clementi),

Sean takes Maddy hostage, but lets her go when Kyle Braxton (Nic Westaway) tells him to. Kyle tries to give Sean some money, but he refuses to take it and attempts to punch Kyle. Kyle dodges the punch and beats Sean up. Sean tries to find a doctor and ends up at Irene Roberts's (Lynne McGranger) house. When Irene tells him that he needs help, he threatens her, Chris Harrington (Johnny Ruffo), Spencer Harrington (Andrew James Morley) and Sasha Bezmel (Demi Harman) with a kitchen knife. Sean attempts to take Sasha hostage, but Chris overpowers him and throws him into a chair. Sean is knocked unconscious and stops breathing, so Spencer performs CPR on him. Irene calls an ambulance and Sean is taken to hospital.

Denny Miller

Denise "Denny" Miller, played by Jessica Grace Smith, made her first screen appearance on 12 February 2014. The character and casting was announced on 28 January 2014. Smith won the role in 2013, a week before she planned to move to Los Angeles. The actress commented "It was crazy! My bags were almost packed for LA. I was so stoked to be a part of the show and have full time work. It's an actor's dream." Denny is a tomboy and Smith described her as being honest and "pretty straight up". Smith branded Denny "not your typical girl" and adding that she would work in the bait shop with Alf Stewart (Ray Meagher).

Linda Somerset

Linda Somerset, played by Hannah Britland, made her first screen appearance on 1 April 2014. Britland appears as Linda in five or six episodes as part of a storyline which sees several show regulars come to London. Britland commented "There is a possibility that I might go out to Australia next year, but nothing is confirmed yet. They came here and met Linda in London, so I was representing Britain for all the Australians to see. I hope I don’t mess it up for us!" The role gave Britland a chance to improve her Australian accent, which she thought was better than it was, until the Australian crew began laughing at her. Britland added "Linda is definitely British not Australian – she's from Preston." It was later confirmed that Casey Braxton (Lincoln Younes) would have a holiday romance with Britland's character. Younes stated that Casey and Linda would "hit it off from the get-go" and that she was fun.

Linda spots Casey Braxton on a tour bus. She later finds him in Trafalgar Square and gives him directions, before spending the rest of the day with him. Linda takes Casey back to her apartment and they have sex. Casey has to leave suddenly when he learns his brother has been taken to the hospital. Casey later returns to Linda's apartment and stays the night. After returning to Australia, Casey video chats with Linda. She asks Casey to return, but he tells her that he needs to stay and be with his family for the time being. A couple of weeks later, Linda invites Casey back to London. However, he tells her that he is dealing with some things at home and decides that they should not see or contact each other again.

Sophie Taylor

Sophie Taylor, played by Bridgette Sneddon, made her first screen appearance on 3 June 2014. The character and Sneddon's casting was announced on 7 December 2013. Sneddon auditioned for the role on the advice of her agent and partner Steve Peacocke, who plays Darryl Braxton in the show. The actress filmed her first scenes during the week commencing 9 December. Holly Byrnes from the Herald Sun reported at the time Sneddon had not learned whether her character would have any airtime with Brax. Of her casting, Sneddon commented "I'm so happy. For so long, Steve's been talking about how great working on Home and Away is. Now I get to experience that too – plus we get to spend more time together, so it's win-win!" Sneddon filmed her final scenes in late 2014 and Sophie departed in early February 2015. Sneddon won the 2015 TV Week and Soap Extra #OMGAward for Best Villain for her portrayal of Sophie.

Sophie was billed as having "a connection to the Bay which brings her back", while Sneddon said her arrival would stir things up. Rebecca Lake from TV Week later reported that Sophie was Nate Cooper's (Kyle Pryor) estranged wife. Sneddon called Sophie's arrival "dramatic" and said she would apprehensive about seeing Nate for the first time in years, while Pryor quipped that Nate would be shocked and horrified to see Sophie. Sophie revealed to Nate that she had got a job in town and would be staying around indefinitely. She also admits that she still loves him and wants him back.

Martin Ashford

Martin "Ash" Ashford, played by George Mason made his first screen appearance on 27 October 2014. A Woman's Day reporter commented that Mason would "bring an explosive plot line" to the show. Ash comes to Summer Bay looking for Darryl Braxton (Steve Peacocke). Mason described his character as being "chilled" and said "He plays up like a second-hand lawnmower but it's all in good fun. I don't think he takes life too seriously but when it comes to family he definitely wants somewhere to belong." He added that Ash had a good heart, but his upbringing meant that he was a bit of a bad guy.

Neive Devlin

Neive Devlin, played by Jolene Anderson, made her first screen appearance on 12 November 2014. The character and Anderson's casting was announced on 22 June 2014. Anderson has a three-month guest stint with the show and she commented, "I flew in to spend some time with my family and all of a sudden a couple of auditions came up. There was one in Melbourne and I thought 'no, too cold' and then this came up and I thought 'Sydney in winter is not too bad actually' and it's been beautiful." Anderson began filming a week before her casting was announced. Anderson described her character as "a woman in a man's world" and added that Neive's arrival would rock one of the show's established relationships. Anderson later said Neive was "a fun character", which attracted her to the role, and that she liked how well the writers wrote for her. Anderson added, "She is quite blunt and doesn't mind speaking her mind. I think she lacks a filter. It's a kind of energy in a character I have never played."

Neive owns a record label, and when she sees Phoebe Nicholson's (Isabella Giovinazzo) music video, she comes to Summer Bay to hear her sing. Neive takes a phone call during Phoebe's performance and then leaves. When Neive returns she tells Phoebe that she wants to sign her. Phoebe's boyfriend Kyle Braxton (Nic Westaway) tries to negotiate a better contract with Neive, but she tells him she is not open to negotiations. Phoebe decides to reject Neive's offer, but Neive likes Phoebe's attitude and gives her the contract she asked for.

Others

References

External links
Characters and cast at the Official AU Home and Away website
Characters and cast at the Official UK Home and Away website
Characters and cast at the Internet Movie Database

, 2014
, Home and Away
2014-related lists